"Caramelldansen" (Swedish for "The Caramell dance") is the first track from Swedish music group Caramell's second and final album Supergott released on November 16, 2001. It became a viral internet meme in the mid-2000s where a sped-up version of the song was attached to a video clip of two anime character girls dancing and making animal ear gestures with their hands. This version of the song was officially released in 2006 to Sweden, and to Japan (as ), the latter of which charted on Oricon. A virtual group called Caramella Girls was launched to promote the song, renditions in other languages, and other cover songs and original songs.

Composition
The original 2001 version of the song by Caramell is in the 4/4 time signature, has a tempo of 138 beats per minute and is in the key of E♭ major. The 2008 remix version has been sped up (in the sense of nightcore) to a tempo of 164.7 beats per minute and is in the key G♭ major.

Internet phenomenon
The meme started as a fifteen frame Flash animation loop showing Mai and Mii, characters of the Japanese visual novel Popotan, doing a hip swing dance with their hands over their heads to imitate rabbit ears, and the chorus of a sped up version of the song.

Background
Popotan first appeared as a Japanese PC game on December 12, 2002. After the anime was aired from July 17 to October 2, 2003, short GIF animations clips were created from the opening of the game and posted on the internet. The clips were matched with various songs, with titles ranging from "Popotan dance" to "Sexy bunny dance".

In late 2005, a sped-up version of the song was posted by a DJ named Speedycake to 4chan. According to an interview with Ruakuu, Speedycake said the speed-up came from a mixing mistake while transitioning the "Caramelldansen" song to a faster BPM, and it ended up being "squeaky and high pitched", but that people were requesting for it anyway. In the same year, its chorus part was combined with the animation loop and posted to 4chan by a "Sven from Sweden", who does not recall using Speedycake's file, but got it from the internet in filesharing. Sven posted the loop with the repeated phrase "ANIME LOL!"

As the video and song clip gained popularity, it became a meme. Artists and fans started to copy the animation and include other characters performing the dance. Its boom began at the end of 2007 in Japan (known as the "Uma uma Boom") where an explosion of different Caramelldansen iterations appeared in the Japanese video-sharing site Nico Nico Douga.

The meme soon after spread to YouTube and became a global phenomenon. Lore Sjöberg wrote in a Wired magazine article about how Flickr users "look down from Flickr Hills into YouTube Chasm and see wailing, gnashing of teeth, and endless versions of "Caramelldansen" and they are sore afraid."

Popularity
While the group Caramell disbanded in 2002, the group's music started to spread widely across the Internet thanks to the popularity of this Internet meme. Malin Sundström commented on the popularity of the meme: "We felt that it was time to move on; that one of our songs now may be a breakthrough is just a bonus." Caramell's Juha "Millboy" Myllylä, responding to questions from Japanese show Netstar NHK, said that he first learned of the dance on YouTube. When asked if he does the dance himself, he responded, "Yeah, well, the dance is very funny to do, so I used to do it every time, I mean in the shower, and I used to show my family and my friends to make them dance. I like it. It's very funny."

The meme is not limited to the small Flash animation loops. 3D animation shorts have been released performing the dance, and live action videos made by fans. The idea of the new Swedish concept came from YouTube, showing more than 16,000 different versions of the original flash animation, including small loops, complete song shorts and live action videos.

Caramelldansen is known in Japan as "Uma uma dance" (ウマウマダンス), because the chorus's lyrics "u-u-ua-ua" were misheard as ウッーウッーウマウマ ("u- u- umauma") The Japanese title is written with the emoticon (°∀°) added to the end. The lyric: "" ("Dance with us, clap your hands") was sometimes misinterpreted as "バルサミコ酢やっぱいらへんで" ("barusamiko-su yappa irahen de"), which translates to "I don't want any balsamic vinegar after all", and ended up being a popular soramimi or mondegreen for the song, even affecting the Japanese language version.

Remix

Japanese music distributor Exit Tunes gained the rights from the original Caramell producers, Remixed Records, to distribute the sped-up version of the original song in Asia, releasing first an album in April 2008 called Uma Uma Dekiru Trance wo Tsukutte Mita which included "Caramelldansen" (named "U-u-uma uma" (Speedycake Remix)) and other popular meme songs at the time. Toromi, the voice actor who voiced Mii in Popotan, also covered the song on a single Toro☆Uma. There was also an official single "U-u-uma uma" release Uma Uma Dekiru Trance reached number 20 on the Oricon charts and stayed on for 16 weeks; and the  "U-u-uma uma" single reached number 16 and stayed 14 weeks.

In March 2009, it was awarded Single of the Year (International) at Recording Industry Association of Japan's 23rd Japan Gold Disc Awards.

Remixed Records released the sped-up version of the original Supergott album on Apple's iTunes Store; the album was called Supergott Speedy Mixes.
In Japan, this was titled U-u-uma-uma SPEED with the song titles completely rewritten with emoticons. Speed reached number 48 on Oricon and stayed 5 weeks.

Remixed Records also released a set of Caramelldansen Speedy Mixes. On September 16, they released an English version of the song called "Caramelldancing". A German version of the song, "Caramelltanzen", was released on April 15, 2009.

Releases
The speedy versions were released and remixed in multiple versions and languages, and the singles / remix EPs credited to other Caramell or Caramella Girls and produced and distributed by Remixed Records unless specified.

Singles and remix EPs:

  (Exit Tunes QWCE-00048, May 21, 2008)
 Caramelldansen speedy mixes (2008) 
 "Caramelldancing" (English, 2008) 
 "Caramelldancing - Christmas Version" (English, 2009) 
 "Caramelltanzen" (German, Remixed Records, EMI Music & RemRec songs, 2009)
 "Caramelldansen Español 4K" (Spanish, Remixed Records, RemRec Songs & Sony/ATV Music Publishing, 2021)

Compilations of:
  (Exit Tunes QWCE-00047, April 16, 2008)

 Supergott Speedy Mixes (2008) 

Caramella Girls

Caramella Girls is a virtual group created by Remixed Records in 2008 to promote the "Caramelldansen" song. They first showed up in the Japanese release "U-u-uma uma" single on May 21, 2008 as two anime character counterparts for the two female vocalists Malin Sundström and Katia Löfgren, removing the rest of the band members. They were then redesigned to be a girl group of three virtual girl characters – Mindy, Nadine, and Vera. At some live events, they would appear in masks and costumes. Remixed Records has further rebranded all related releases on music platforms from Caramell to "Caramella Girls".

On March 18, 2011, Caramella Girls released the song "Boogie Bam Dance".
In October 2012, the band released the Caramelldancing Remixes EP, which features remixes of the English version of the Caramelldansen song by Crazy 1, No Trixx, and DJ Triplestar.

Caramella Girls has since released other songs and videos. Some of these were written by Kim Andre Arnesen and Kristian Lagerström; and some are covers of other bubblegum pop tunes. A few of the songs are played at normal speed. In 2020, they released a digital compilation album (without "Caramelldansen") called Sweet Decade.

Credits controversy
In 2019, Remixed Records owner Giovanni Sconfienza retroactively changed the credits for Caramelldansen and its various remixes from Caramell to the Caramella Girls on digital streaming platforms including Spotify and iTunes, as well as the official Caramelldansen YouTube channel. YouTuber jan Misali released a video essay investigating this change in October 2021, with the aim of explaining the true authorship of the song. Sconfienza issued a copyright strike on the video in an attempt to suppress the information and delete Misali's channel. As of February 2022, the video has been restored. In March 2022, the Caramella Girls YouTube channel released their own video statement "Who Wrote Caramelldansen?" where originating vocalist Malin Sundström tries to explain the authorship and performance of the two most notable tracks (2001 and 2008).

Use in other media
In July 2009, the Taiwanese gaming company Gamania launched an advertising campaign with the "Caramelldansen" song for the Japanese version of its online game Lucent Heart. "Caramelldansen" has also been used in Japanese arcade games.  A rhythm game of the dance was released by Remixed Records for the Apple iPhone and iPod Touch. The team behind popular comedy site LoadingReadyRun has performed the dance for their Desert Bus for Hope charity fundraisers. In August 2010, the characters in the American Disney Channel program Phineas and Ferb perform the dance in the episode  "Summer Belongs to You" when they stop by Tokyo.
"Caramelldansen" is one of the licensed songs in the 2013 edition of Dance Dance Revolution. The dance has also appeared as a purchasable "Cat Ear Dance" emote in the 2017 video game Destiny 2.

See also
 List of Internet phenomena
 2 Phút Hơn
 Loituma Girl
 Nyan Cat

References

External links
 
 Caramelldansen official website (archive) 
 
 History of the Caramelldansen meme (2008), by "Ruakuu" via blogspot
 who wrote Caramelldansen? (October 25, 2021), by jan Misali, via YouTube 

2001 songs
Caramell songs
Internet memes
Internet memes introduced in 2006
Viral videos
Macaronic songs
2000s fads and trends
Novelty and fad dances
Songs containing the I–V-vi-IV progression
Swedish-language songs